The Kaholuamano noctuid moth (Hypena senicula) is an extinct moth in the family Erebidae. The species was first described by Edward Meyrick in 1928. It was endemic to the Hawaiian island of Kauaʻi, but is now considered extinct.

References

Endemic moths of Hawaii
Extinct Hawaiian animals
Extinct moths
Extinct insects since 1500
Taxonomy articles created by Polbot